Al Jawharah Tower is a residential high-rise building in the city of Jeddah, Saudi Arabia, on the Corniche Road facing the Red Sea. It is owned by DAMAC Properties.

See also
 List of tallest buildings in Saudi Arabia
 List of tallest residential buildings in the world
 List of tallest structures in the Middle East

References

2014 establishments in Saudi Arabia
Skyscrapers in Jeddah
Residential skyscrapers in Saudi Arabia